Ismail Mahmoud Mardanli (born January 8, 1987 in Aleppo, Syria) is a Qatarian football player who is currently playing for Al-Wakrah on loan from Umm Salal in the Qatar Stars League.

Club career

Early career
Mahmoud began with the Al-Ittihad Aleppo youth squad before he moved with his family to Qatar.

El-Jaish
Mardanli helped the team with the promotion by scoring many goals in the 2010-2011 season, despite that he never became a regular after the promotion. On October 30, 2011 he scored his first goal in the Qatar Stars League in the 2-1 win against Al Sadd.

Umm Salal
On January 17, 2013 he joined Umm Salal on loan until the end of the season.

References

1987 births
Living people
Syrian footballers
Syrian expatriate footballers
Expatriate footballers in Qatar
Association football midfielders
Al-Ittihad Aleppo players
El Jaish SC players
Umm Salal SC players
Al-Wakrah SC players
Qatar Stars League players
Qatari Second Division players
Sportspeople from Aleppo
Qatari footballers
Qatari people of Syrian descent
Naturalised citizens of Qatar
Qatar international footballers